William A. Curtis House, also known as Villa Florenza, is a historic home located at Raleigh, Wake County, North Carolina.  It was built about 1915, and is a two-story, three bay wide, Late Victorian-style frame dwelling with a pyramidal roof.  It has a full-height pedimented wing and one-story rear kitchen ell.  It features a one-story wraparound porch.  It was home to a prominent African-American family.

It was listed on the National Register of Historic Places in 2008.

References

African-American history in Raleigh, North Carolina
Houses on the National Register of Historic Places in North Carolina
Victorian architecture in North Carolina
Houses completed in 1915
Houses in Raleigh, North Carolina
National Register of Historic Places in Raleigh, North Carolina